The 1984–85 Connecticut Huskies men's basketball team represented the University of Connecticut in the 1984–85 collegiate men's basketball season. The Huskies completed the season with a 13–15 overall record. The Huskies were members of the Big East Conference where they finished with a 6–10 record. The Huskies played their home games at Hugh S. Greer Field House in Storrs, Connecticut, the New Haven Coliseum in New Haven, Connecticut and the Hartford Civic Center in Hartford, Connecticut and they were led by eighth-year head coach Dom Perno.

Schedule 

|-
!colspan=12 style=""| Regular Season

|-
!colspan=12 style=""| Big East tournament

Schedule Source:

References 

UConn Huskies men's basketball seasons
Connecticut Huskies
Connecticut Huskies
Connecticut Huskies